The men's longboard competition at the 2022 Pan American Surf Games was held at Playa Venao in Pedasí District, Panama from 9 to 12 August 2022.

Competition format
The competition consisted of four rounds:

 Round 1: 6 heats, 5 heats of 4 surfers and 1 of 3. The top 2 in each heat (12 total) advanced to quarter-finals.
 Quarter-finals: 4 heats of 3 surfers each; the top 2 in each heat (8 total) advanced to semi-finals.
 Semi-finals: 2 heats of 4 surfers each; the top 2 in each heat (4 total) advanced to the final.
 Final: 1 heat of 4 surfers.

The length of each heat was 20 minutes. Scoring for each wave taken by the surfers is an average of 5 scores given by 5 judges, ranging from 0 to 10 points. The best two waves for each surfer counting and are added to obtain the total score.

Results

Round 1

Heat 1

Heat 2

Heat 3

Heat 4

Heat 5

Heat 6

Quarter-finals

Heat 7

Heat 8

Heat 9

Heat 10

Semi-finals

Heat 11

Heat 12

Final

Heat 13

References

2022 Pan American Surf Games